Battaglia Terme is a town and comune in the Veneto region of Italy, in the province of Padua.

Battaglia lies at the easternmost edge of the volcanic Euganean Hills, and has been noted for its warm saline springs and natural vapour grotto since the Middle Ages.

History
The construction of the navigable Battaglia canal in the early 13th century brought traffic and growth to the town which commanded a central position at the confluence of several canals in the network of barge traffic that linked Este and Padua, the Adriatic, the Lagoon of Venice and the north by means of the Brenta Canal, the canalized Bacchiglione and the Adige.

Main sights

Villa Emo-Capodilista: erected in the mid-17th century by Marquis Benedetto Selvatico, the owner of the mineral springs. The castle features several thermal lakes and has been the royal residence of the Italian King Vittorio Emanuele III during the first World War.
Castello del Catajo: large castle-residence with internal frescoes by Giambattista Zelotti
San Giacomo: baroque style parish church

Twin town
 Möhringen, Germany

References

External links
Official website 
Castello del Catajo 
City information 

Cities and towns in Veneto
Castles in Italy
Spa towns in Italy